Bebearia guineensis, the wide-banded palm forester, is a butterfly in the family Nymphalidae. It is found in Nigeria, Cameroon, the Republic of the Congo, the western part of the Democratic Republic of the Congo and northern Angola. The habitat consists of primary, undisturbed forests.

References

Butterflies described in 1867
guineensis
Butterflies of Africa
Taxa named by Baron Cajetan von Felder
Taxa named by Rudolf Felder